The Narrows Commercial Historic District encompasses the historic commercial heart of Narrows, Virginia.  It is centered at the intersection of Main and
Monroe Streets and MacArthur Lane, near the confluence of Wolf Creek and the New River.  The area's major development did not begin until after the arrival in 1882 of the railroad, with most of it taking place in the two decades before World War II.  Major buildings include the 1927 Norfolk and Western Railroad depot and the 1940 General Macarthur Hotel.

The district was listed on the National Register of Historic Places in 2014.

See also
National Register of Historic Places listings in Giles County, Virginia

References

Historic districts on the National Register of Historic Places in Virginia
Buildings and structures in Giles County, Virginia
National Register of Historic Places in Giles County, Virginia